Dettighofen may refer to:

Dettighofen, Switzerland
Dettighofen, Baden-Württemberg, Germany